Conseil des écoles fransaskoises (CÉF) is a school board in the Canadian province of Saskatchewan. It is headquartered in Regina.

Among Saskatchewan's 27 school boards, the CÉF is the only school division offering comprehensive education from preschool to grade 12 in French as a first language. CÉF also has the particularity of being able to offer educational services as public and Catholic school board, depending on the needs expressed. Publicly funded, CÉF offers French instruction to Fransaskois students enrolled in 15 elementary and secondary schools across the province.

Historical Overview

CÉF was created in 1995. Its creation stems directly from the application of section 23 of the Canadian Charter of Rights and Freedoms, which gives Francophones in Saskatchewan the right to manage their schools. It was a constitutional order that motivated the establishment of the Fransaskois school division.

CÉF has constitutional obligations incumbent on it under sections 23 and 24 of the Canadian Charter of Rights and Freedoms and related case law. This responsibility takes the form of French-language school administration on behalf of entitled parents and for the benefit of the French-speaking community of Saskatchewan.

Triple Mandate

CÉF has a threefold academic, cultural and community mandate to meet its constitutional obligations. Its primary mandate as a school board is to ensure that all students entrusted to it can develop to their full potential by benefiting from a quality education in French as a first language. As part of its cultural and community mandates, CÉF offers students a variety of Francophone activities that allow them to assert their Francophone identity and develop their linguistic potential and their sense of belonging within the Fransaskois community. CÉF works hand in glove with Fransaskois organisations and the community to support the development and preservation of the language and culture of the Francophone minority in Saskatchewan.

Fransaskois Schools' Popularity

Since its creation, CÉF has grown from 890 students to over 2,000 students in 2020. There are Fransaskois schools in several cities and villages across Saskatchewan.

CÉF schools are schools of excellence in French as a first language, administered by an organization that focuses on customer service and which continues to evolve in order to offer quality educational and student services. CÉF's educational offer and delivery modes meet a multitude of needs - economic, social, demographic and community - with which a French-language school system operating in a predominantly English-speaking environment must contend with at a time when globalization, cultural, social justice and sustainable development have come to the forefront.

Year after year, CÉF schools graduates obtain academic results in English and French that are superior to those of students from English language schools in Saskatchewan (including students from French immersion schools). Our graduates obtain diplomas bearing the mention “bilingual francophone” which are recognized not only by the Ministry of Education, but also clears the way post-secondary studies in the language of their choice here in Saskatchewan, in Canada and worldwide. Above all, the student success prevails.

Infrastructure

In March 2019, Conseil des écoles fransaskoises and the Government of Saskatchewan reached an agreement to build three new French-language schools in Regina, Prince Albert and Saskatoon over a 6-year period to meet the needs of French-speaking families in the province. 

 In 2020, the Government of Saskatchewan announced the construction of a new school in the northern part of city of Regina scheduled to open for the start of the September 2023 school year.
 Discussions are ongoing for the construction of a new school in Prince Albert. The possibility of acquiring former Rivier Academy and the possibility of building a new school with allocated community space is also still under consideration.
 CÉF meanwhile continues to work towards the construction of a new school in Saskatoon which under the agreement ratified with the provincial government should open its doors in time for the start of the school year in 2025 -- when the three school should be completed and welcoming students under the agreement with the Province.
 In the meantime, CÉF continues to promote its pressing needs in other Francophone communities in Saskatchewan.

Civic Community Schools

In Fransaskoisie, the school is at the heart of the community. Although the Fransaskois recognize that their journey is part of Western Canada's colonization movement --and thus are the beneficiaries of the numbered treaties -- they have established their own communities and institutions knowing that to survive as Francophones in a predominantly anglophone ocean of people, they had to get their own schools. Fransaskois communities today continue to evolve, thanks to the contribution of Francophone immigration.

Fransaskois schools are now part of an inclusive undertaking aimed at welcoming Francophone students from here and elsewhere, and at fostering the development of Francophone communities by helping them achieve their full potential. The approach favored by the Fransaskois is the civic community school approach: a school that harnesses the knowledge and wisdom the community offers to train citizens committed to the development of their community, by making use of human, organizational, cultural resources and the social wealth available for the benefit of their educational journey.

Conseil Scolaire Fransaskois

The governance of Conseil des écoles fransaskois is ensured by Conseil scolaire fransaskois (CSF), the table of elected officials made up of 10 school trustees representing each of the Francophone school regions recognized by government authorities. The table of elected officials is responsible for establishing major orientations of the Fransaskois education system and responsible for ensuring that the vision and mission of the organisation are respected.

List of Fransaskois Schools by Community 

Circa 2023 there are plans to open a new school each in Prince Albert, Regina, and Saskatoon. The new Regina school will be in the northwest of the city, and will address overcrowding in French language elementary schools. It is scheduled to completely replace École du Parc. It will be partially funded by a stimulus package and will cost $21 million. The anticipated capacity is 350. Its attendance area would be areas north of Dewdney Avenue.

Éducation Internationale CÉF

Since 2022, CÉF offers a well-established program recognized by Canadian authorities, preparing international students who aspire to post-secondary studies in Canada in French or English. Rigorous supervision is provided in an inclusive, welcoming and safe environment.

CÉF Radio

2022 was also the inaugural year of the activities of CÉFRadio, the multiplatform community radio station of Conseil des écoles fransaskoises. Launched to allow students, teachers, parents and the Fransaskois community to familiarize themselves with professions in the field of journalism and communications, the programs produced in schools from elementary to high school give a large place to oral expression, a pivotal element in their learning. This also contributes to the construction of identity among students and the involvement in community-based in activities.

See also
 List of schools in Regina, Saskatchewan

References

External links

Fransaskois culture
French-language education in Canada
School divisions in Saskatchewan